Caridina yunnanensis is a freshwater shrimp from Xundian and Songming Counties, Yunnan, China. It is known to live in mountain streams and reservoirs.

References

Atyidae
Freshwater crustaceans of Asia
Crustaceans described in 1938